Next: A Primer on Urban Painting is a 2005 documentary film from Canadian filmmaker Pablo Aravena, exploring graffiti around the world. Sequences were shot in the United States, Canada, France, the Netherlands, Germany, England, Spain, Japan and Brazil.

External links 
 

Canadian documentary films
Documentary films about graffiti
2005 films
English-language Canadian films
2005 documentary films
2000s Canadian films